Mukim Labi is a mukim in the interior of Belait District, Brunei.

Geography 
The mukim is located in the central and south-western part of the district, bordering Mukim Liang to the north, Mukim Bukit Sawat to the north-east, Mukim Sukang to the east, the Malaysian state of Sarawak to the south and west and Mukim Kuala Balai and Mukim Seria to the north-west.

The mukim is named after Kampong Labi, one of the villages it encompasses.

Demographics 
As of 2016 census, the population was 1,216 with  males and  females. The mukim had 343 households occupying 325 dwellings. The entire population lived in rural areas.

Villages 
As of 2016, the mukim comprised the following census villages:

For administrative purposes the villages above are overseen by two village heads:

Facilities 
Facilities in the mukim include:
 Labi Primary School — a government primary school established in 1959
 Chung Hwa School, Labi — a private Chinese primary school established in 1946
 Labi Health Clinic — a community health centre opened in 2002 and has since provided residents with mainly outpatient and dental
 Labi Police Station — established in 1967
 Labi Post Office — established in 1966

Kampong Labi Mosque is the sole mosque in the mukim.

Agriculture 
The mukim is home to Lot Sengkuang, one of the important rice cultivation area in the country. It was established in 1962, initially on a  land. A total of  has been dedicated for the purpose of increasing local rice cultivation output.

The mukim is also home to the first commercial coffee plantation; the first coffee trees were planted in 2012 and has since grown to about 10,000 trees on a  land.

In 2003, it was estimated that Labi produced 607 metric tonnes of vegetables, nearly 1,700 metric tonnes of fruits and 170 metric tonnes of paddy.

Tourism and recreation 
Tourist attractions and recreation parks in the mukim include:

 Luagan Lalak Recreation Park — a recreation park built around and on a pond
 Sungai Mau Reacreation Park — a recreation park in Kampong Sungai Mau
 Teraja Longhouse — a longhouse in Kampong Teraja
 Mendaram Besar Longhouse — a longhouse in Kampong Mendaram Besar
 Belulok Waterfall — a waterfall in Labi
 Teraja Waterfall — a waterfall from Teraja River

Notes

References 

Labi
Belait District